Mayann Elizabeth Francis,  (born February 18, 1946) was the 31st Lieutenant Governor of the Canadian province of Nova Scotia.

Early life and education
Born in Sydney, Nova Scotia and raised in Whitney Pier, she is the daughter of Archpriest George A. Francis and Thelma D. Francis, and is a graduate of Saint Mary's University and completed graduate studies at New York University.

Career
She was the director and CEO of the Nova Scotia Human Rights Commission from 1999-2006. She also served as Nova Scotia's provincial ombudsman from December 2000 until December 2003, the first woman to be appointed to that post. Previously, she served in senior positions with the Government of Ontario, Dalhousie University and the District Attorney's office in Kings County, New York.

Community involvement
She is a past member of United Way/Centraide, the Mascoll Foundation, the board of governors at University College of Cape Breton (now Cape Breton University), the general council of the Canadian National Institute for the Blind and she sat on Nova Scotia's Voluntary Planning Board. Francis has been recognized for her outstanding achievements with a Harry Jerome Award, an award from the Multicultural Education Council of Nova Scotia and a Golden Jubilee Medal. She is a member of the African Orthodox Church, a church formed in the late 19th century mainly for the African American community in the United States.

As Lieutenant Governor
On June 20, 2006, she was appointed by Governor General Michaëlle Jean, on the advice of Prime Minister Stephen Harper, to the office of Lieutenant Governor of Nova Scotia; she assumed office on September 7, 2006.  Francis is the first Black Nova Scotian and the second woman to serve as Lieutenant Governor of Nova Scotia.

In May 2008, Lieutenant Governor Francis was awarded a Doctorate of Humane Letters from Mount Saint Vincent University.

On February 16, 2012, Prime Minister Stephen Harper announced the appointment of Brigadier General (Retired) John James Grant, CMM, CD as the 32nd Lieutenant Governor of Nova Scotia. Francis was succeeded on April 12, 2012.

After serving

In 2016, Francis spoke out in response to a recent case of racial profiling in a retail setting in Nova Scotia. She validated the complaint, stating that she herself was the target of racial profiling while shopping at least once a month.

Arms

References

External links
Lieutenant-Governor of Nova Scotia

Living people
Canadian activists
Black Nova Scotians
Lieutenant Governors of Nova Scotia
People from Sydney, Nova Scotia
Women in Nova Scotia politics
Black Canadian politicians
1946 births
Canadian women viceroys
Saint Mary's University (Halifax) alumni
New York University alumni
Black Canadian women